The Sower is a sculpture by the Belgian artist Constantin Meunier of which multiple copies were made.

References

External links
 

Sculptures in Germany
Works by Belgian people
Sculptures of men in Germany
Statues in Germany